Columba College (Irish: Coláiste Choilm) is an integrated Presbyterian school in Roslyn, Dunedin, New Zealand.  The roll is made up of pupils of all ages.  The majority of pupils are in the girls' secondary, day and boarding school, but there is also a primary school for boys and girls in years 1-6.

History

Columba College was established in 1915 by the Presbyterian Church of New Zealand as a private day and boarding school for girls with co-educational primary classes.  The Rev'd Alexander Whyte was a key figure in the foundation of Columba College, through his vision for a Presbyterian girls' school.

Columba College was created from two earlier Dunedin girls' schools, Girton College and Braemar House.  Girton College had been founded in 1886 by the first woman graduate of the University of Otago, Caroline Freeman, who sold it to Frances Ross in 1891. Ross then purchased Braemar House and combined it with Girton College. 

Frances Ross was appointed by the Presbytery of Dunedin as the first Head Mistress of the newly created Columba College in 1914.  The schools moved to the current site at Bishopscourt, purchased from the first Anglican bishop for Otago and Southland, Bishop Nevill. The large house there had been designed by William Mason and built in 1872.

Whereas most church schools took a conservative view of girls' education, Columba built on the traditions of Girton College. High educational standards were set, while due attention was given to music, physical training, domestic science and, of course, religious instruction. The differing abilities and aspirations of the pupils were acknowledged and fostered. Ross expected a great deal from her girls and was not disappointed. Columba girls took prizes, scholarships and degrees at university and made their mark in a range of occupations.

Columba College was integrated as a composite school under the terms of the Private Schools' Integration Act effective 31 January 1994.

Boarding facilities
Attached to the school are boarding facilities, catering for approximately 110 students, both domestic and international from years 7 to 13. Students live in one of two on-campus buildings, Katharine Buchan House or Bishopscourt.

Notable alumnae

 Frances Hodgkins - artist, at Braemar House
 Cilla McQueen - poet
 Greta Stevenson - botanist

Notable staff

See also
List of schools in New Zealand

Notes

External links
 Columba College

Presbyterian schools in New Zealand
Boarding schools in New Zealand
Educational institutions established in 1915
Girls' schools in New Zealand
Secondary schools in Dunedin
1915 establishments in New Zealand
Alliance of Girls' Schools Australasia